Kislingbury is a village in Northamptonshire, England, about  west of Northampton town centre, and close to junctions 15A and 16 of the M1 motorway.

The villages name origin is uncertain. 'At the gravelly-place fortification' or perhaps, 'at the fortification of Cysel's people'.

Demographics
2001 census data shows 1,221 people resident in the Parish Council area consisting of 591 males and 630 females, in 497 household of which 79.5% were owner occupied or being purchased with a mortgage. At the 2011 census the population had increased to 1,237.

Governance
The village is currently governed by West Northamptonshire council. Prior to local government changes in 2021 it was in the district council area of South Northamptonshire  where it was part of Harpole and Grange ward, together with the parishes of Milton Malsor, Harpole, Rothersthorpe and Gayton. It was within the area of Northamptonshire County Council and is in the Parliamentary Constituency of Daventry. The Member of Parliament is Chris Heaton-Harris (Conservative). Prior to the 2010 General Election the village was in Northampton South constituency.

Transport
The M1 London to Yorkshire motorway between junctions 15a and 16 passes and makes its presence known, close to the south west of the village, and junction 16 is just two miles distant.

Facilities
The village has three pub/restaurants, the most well-known being the Cromwell Cottage near the river, which has a tenuous historical connection with Oliver Cromwell: Parliamentarian forces spent a night nearby en route to Naseby. The others are the Old Red Lion along the High Street and The Sun Inn on Mill Road.

Surroundings
The River Nene flows past the village close by to the north, through an old, narrow bridge - narrow, that is, for both vehicles and the river which frequently floods. The most recent serious incident in 1998 caused flood damage to several houses in the village. Some flood attenuation work has since been carried out but it remains to be seen if this proves adequate. The village carries heavy traffic being on a route to the larger village of Bugbrooke with the large Campion Secondary School which serves the village and a large catchment area around. Heavy vehicles from sand quarries in the area and also Heygates Flour Mill also use the village main road. The village is on the same side of the motorway, and close to the Northampton Borough boundary with the urban area of the town slowly getting closer with developments to the western side of the town.

References

External links

 Village website including parish council
(Google Maps)

Villages in Northamptonshire
West Northamptonshire District
Civil parishes in Northamptonshire